Michael Paul Underwood (born 26 October 1975) is an English television presenter, best known as a children's TV presenter on CBBC and CITV. He can be seen as a fifteen-year-old in an episode of The Crystal Maze, then presented by Richard O'Brien. He presented the primetime ITV series Let Me Entertain You in 2014 and was a reporter for Real Stories with Ranvir Singh.

Career
Underwood attended Weston Favell Academy in Northampton; he later graduated from the University of Plymouth's Rolle College, Exmouth with a BEd (Hons) in Drama & Performance. Before winning a six-week CBBC presenting contract on the BBC television show Whatever You Want, Underwood had previously made it to the last four in interviews for the Blue Peter vacancy subsequently filled by Simon Thomas.

Underwood was an entertainment correspondent for the ITV Breakfast programme GMTV from 2005 until 2008. In 2006, Underwood duetted with The X Factor contestant Andy Abraham on the Christmas single, "December Brings Me Back To You".

Underwood competed in the 2008 series of Dancing on Ice, partnered by professional skater Melanie Lambert. However, he pulled out of the series following a broken ankle in the run-up to the third show. They took part in the show the following year for the fourth series.

Underwood presented on Heart FM from April 2013, filling in with Zoe Hanson. He left this role in December 2013.

In early 2014, he presented the ITV entertainment series Let Me Entertain You on Saturday nights. Underwood was a reporter on the ITV series Surprise Surprise until 2015 and Real Stories with Ranvir Singh until 2016. He has been a stand-in entertainment reporter on Good Morning Britain multiple times. He is a reporter on the Channel 5 series Do the Right Thing with Eamonn and Ruth.

He appeared in the music video for Wet Wet Wet's single "Too Many People".

In 2020, due to lack of work he announced that he was to retire from presenting and had become a teacher. However he returned to presenting shortly after and is currently the host of the Channel 4 daytime show 'Tool Club'.

Underwood joined digital station Virgin Radio Groove for to its weekend line-up in the 10am-2pm slot after fronting Virgin Radio's 500 Words: Black Lives Matter children's writing competition alongside his wife Angellica Bell.

Personal life
Underwood married his former CBBC co-star Angellica Bell in New York City in December 2010. They have a son and a daughter.

Filmography
TV presenting 
 Whatever You Want (1999)
 CBBC (1999–2002) – Continuity presenter 
 The Make Shift – Presenter
 CITV (2002–2003) – Continuity presenter 
 The White Knuckle Tour – Presenter
 The Big Bang (2002–2003) – Presenter
 Eliminator (2003–2004) – Presenter
 Starfinder (2003–2004) – Presenter
 Jungle Run (2003–2006) – Presenter
 Ministry of Mayhem (2004) – Presenter
 Junior Eurovision Song Contest 2005: British Final presenter (also in 2004)
 Junior Eurovision Song Contest 2005 – Commentator
 British Soap Awards: The After Party (2006, 2009–10) – Presenter
 ITV2 Celebrity Daredevils – "SAS Training"
 It Shouldn't Happen to a Showbiz Reporter (2005) – Showbiz reporter
 GMTV (2005–2008) – Entertainment correspondent 
 Bingo Night Live (2008) – Presenter
 Live from Studio Five (2010) – Guest presenter
 The Zone (2010) – Co-presenter
 OK! TV – Guest presenter
 Let Me Entertain You (2014) – Presenter
 Surprise Surprise (2014–2015) – Reporter
 Real Stories with Ranvir Singh (2015–2016) – Reporter
 Good Morning Britain (2016–2017) – Stand-in entertainment reporter
 Do the Right Thing with Eamonn and Ruth (2018–2019) – Reporter
Tool Club (2021-) - Presenter

Other TV work 
 The Crystal Maze (1990) – Team captain 
 Hollywood 7 (2001) – Pizza Delivery Boy
 Dancing on Ice (2008, 2009) – Contestant
 All Star Mr and Mrs (2009) – Contestant, with Angellica Bell
 The Door (2010) – Contestant 
 Born To Shine (2011) – Contestant
 Celebrity MasterChef (2012) – Contestant
 Celebrity Mastermind (2012) – Contestant

References

External links
Official website

1975 births
Living people
Alumni of the University of Plymouth
Black British television personalities
English television presenters
GMTV presenters and reporters
People from Northampton
People educated at Weston Favell Academy
English people of Ghanaian descent